Isodurene or 1,2,3,5-tetramethylbenzene is an organic compound with the formula C6H2(CH3)4, classified as an aromatic hydrocarbon. It is a flammable colorless liquid which is nearly insoluble in water but soluble in organic solvents. It occurs naturally in coal tar. Isodurene is one of three isomers of  tetramethylbenzene, the other two being prehnitene (1,2,3,4-tetramethylbenzene) and durene (1,2,4,5-tetramethylbenzene).

Preparation
Isoodurene can be prepared from mesitylene, which is converted to mesityl bromide.  The latter reacts with magnesium to give the Grignard reagent,  which can be alkylated with dimethyl sulfate:

Industrially, isodurene can be isolated from the reformed fraction of oil refineries. It may also be produced by methylation of toluene, xylenes, and trimethylbenzenes.

References

Alkylbenzenes
C4-Benzenes